Badhan, also known as Baran is a city in the Sanaag region of Somaliland.

Overview 

It was always in danger of flooding during the raining seasons. In 1971, the town was re-located near a borewell called Badhan and it has assumed the name ever since. The area was first settled in the 14th century by Somali herdsmen from the Warsangali subclan of the Darod clan, as there was water available for their flocks.

Badhan is also famous for being the stage of battles between the Dervishes of Mohammed Abdullah Hassan and the Sultanate of Warsangeli. Hassan, the leader of Dervishes, ordered the construction of a new grand fort in the city. Nowadays, the fort is in need of restoration, as time has worn it down.

Politics

Badhan served as the capital of Maakhir state, which was later incorporated into Puntland in January 2009.  The entity was initially established by the Warsangali community in opposition to Puntland and Somaliland's contention over their inhabited territory. 

In September 2019, local election was held in Baran on the initiative of the Puntland Ministry of Interior, and Ahmed Mohamed Timir was elected mayor. In January 2021, Puntland deployed troops to Badhan to prevent Somaliland's attempts to conduct voter registration in the city. Abdirashid Yusuf Jibril, the Speaker of Puntland's House of Representatives (Parliament) arrived in the city to oversee the operation. 

Somaliland's influence in the city was reduced when almost all local militia previously loyal to Somaliland defected to Puntland, and strengthened Puntland's hold on the city. Mahmood reports:

In January 2018, Gamal Mohamed Hassan, the Minister of Planning and International Cooperation visited badhan, as well the town of Dhahar in the Sanaag region along with Puntland officials.

Demographics 
The town is exclusively settled by the Warsangali clan of the wider Harti Darod clan.

Education
The Somali National University has a branch in Badhan. In January 2021, the university's central committee commended the Puntland branch of the National University in Badhan district, which is the last branch to be included in the university, for its good performance, both for its students and for its colleagues. The construction of the university was funded at the cost 6 Million USD by the Kuwait Fund for Arab Economic Development in agreement with the Federal Government of Somalia and implemented by the Puntland authorities.

Media
The Somali National Television and Radio Mogadishu report from Badhan and provide regular news coverage.

Notable residents

References

Populated places in Sanaag
Cities in Somaliland